Ben Levin or Benjamin Levin may refer to:

 Ben Levin, the co-creator of Craig of the Creek and a writer for the animated series Bounty Hunters and Steven Universe
 Benjamin "Ben" Levin (born 1952), convicted child pornographer and registered sex offender in Canada.
 Ben Levin, guitarist of the American band Bent Knee
Benny Blanco, record producer and pop songwriter

See also
 Benjamin Levin (disambiguation)